Manoochehr Shafaei (born 23 September 1949) is an Iranian human rights activists, journalist, founder and owner of the Azadegy magazine, founder and chairman of the board of Human Rights Defending Association for Iran, inventor and retired sabre fencer. As a fencer he won a gold and a bronze medal at the 1974 Asian Games. He also coached his younger sister Mahvash.

References

1949 births
Living people
Iranian male sabre fencers
Asian Games gold medalists for Iran
Asian Games bronze medalists for Iran
Asian Games medalists in fencing
Fencers at the 1974 Asian Games
Medalists at the 1974 Asian Games
Iranian democracy activists
Iranian dissidents
Iranian human rights activists
20th-century Iranian people
21st-century Iranian people